Ponera is a genus of ponerine ants.
The name is the Latinized form of the Ancient Greek  ('wicked, wretched').

Description
Workers are very small to small in size (1–4 mm); queen are similar to workers but winged. This genus is very similar to Cryptopone, Hypoponera and Pachycondyla.

Biology
Ponera nests contain less than 100 workers in protected places on the ground, most often in the soil or in cracks, rotten wood, under bark or moss on rotten logs.

Distribution
Ponera is known from the Holarctic, Samoa, New Guinea and Australia.

Species

Ponera alisana Terayama, 1986
Ponera alpha Taylor, 1967
Ponera augusta Taylor, 1967
Ponera bableti Perrault, 1993
Ponera baka Xu, 2001
Ponera bawana Xu, 2001
Ponera bishamon Terayama, 1996
Ponera borneensis Taylor, 1967
Ponera chapmani Taylor, 1967
Ponera chiponensis Terayama, 1986
Ponera clavicornis Emery, 1900
Ponera coarctata (Latreille, 1802)
Ponera colaensis Mann, 1921
Ponera diodonta Xu, 2001
†Ponera elegantissima Meunier, 1923
Ponera elegantula Wilson, 1957
Ponera exotica Smith, 1962
Ponera guangxiensis Zhou, 2001
Ponera hubeiensis Wang & Zhao, 2009
Ponera incerta (Wheeler, 1933)
Ponera indica Bharti & Wachkoo, 2012
Ponera japonica Wheeler, 1906
Ponera kohmoku Terayama, 1996
Ponera leae Forel, 1913
†Ponera leptocephala Emery, 1891
†Ponera lobulifera Dlussky, 2009
Ponera loi Taylor, 1967
Ponera longlina Xu, 2001
Ponera manni Taylor, 1967
†Ponera mayri Dlussky, 2009
Ponera menglana Xu, 2001
Ponera nangongshana Xu, 2001
Ponera norfolkensis Wheeler, 1935
Ponera oreas (Wheeler, 1933)
Ponera paedericera Zhou, 2001
Ponera pennsylvanica Buckley, 1866
Ponera pentodontos Xu, 2001
Ponera petila Wilson, 1957
Ponera pianmana Xu, 2001
Ponera rishen Terayama, 2009
Ponera ruficornis Spinola, 1851
Ponera scabra Wheeler, 1928
Ponera selenophora Emery, 1900
Ponera shennong Terayama, 2009
Ponera sikkimensis Bharti & Rilta, 2015
Ponera sinensis Wheeler, 1928
Ponera swezeyi (Wheeler, 1933)
Ponera syscena Wilson, 1957
Ponera sysphinctoides Bernard, 1950
Ponera szaboi Wilson, 1957
Ponera szentivanyi Wilson, 1957
Ponera taipingensis Forel, 1913
Ponera taiyangshen Terayama, 2009
Ponera takaminei Terayama, 1996
Ponera tamon Terayama, 1996
Ponera taylori Bharti & Wachkoo, 2012
Ponera tenuis (Emery, 1900)
Ponera terayamai Leong, Guénard, Shiao & Lin, 2019
Ponera testacea Emery, 1895
Ponera tudigong Pierce, Leong & Guénard, 2019
†Ponera wheeleri Dlussky, 2009
Ponera woodwardi Taylor, 1967
Ponera wui Leong, Guénard, Shiao & Lin, 2019
Ponera xantha Xu, 2001
Ponera xenagos Wilson, 1957
Ponera yuhuang Terayama, 2009

References

External links

Ponerinae
Ant genera